Laws Stores Ltd. was a chain of supermarkets which existed throughout the North East of England and Southern Scotland. They were founded in Gateshead in the last quarter of the 19th century by Arthur William Laws. They were sold in 1907 to Arthur McClelland (1884–1966) though Laws' eldest son William Arthur Laws (1890-1955) retained and managed two of the original shops in Jarrow, which went bankrupt in 1927 due to The Great Depression. The rest of the business survived, and during the 1950s under the managing directorship of Grigor McClelland introduced a number of innovations   including self-service and modern warehousing and distribution systems. The company grew significantly during the supermarket boom of the late 60s and early 70s, but then faced challenges in the economic crisis and from larger supermarket chains.

In 1985 the whole chain was sold to Wm Low, which was then sold to Tesco in about 1994.

References

Defunct supermarkets of the United Kingdom
Companies based in Tyne and Wear